This is a list of states in the Holy Roman Empire beginning with the letter F:

References

F